The 2018 Morgan State Bears football team represented Morgan State University in the 2018 NCAA Division I FCS football season. They were led by first-year interim head coach Ernest T. Jones. The Bears played their home games at Hughes Stadium. They were a member of the Mid-Eastern Athletic Conference (MEAC). They finished the season 4–7, 3–4 in MEAC play to finish in a tie for sixth place.

Previous season
The Bears finished the 2017 season 1–10, 1–7 in MEAC play to finish in last place.

On December 18, 2017 Fred Farrier was dismissed and released from his contract. He finished at Morgan State with a record of 4–18.

Preseason

MEAC preseason poll
In a vote of the MEAC head coaches and sports information directors, the Bears were picked to finish in ninth place.

Preseason All-MEAC Teams
The Bears had seven players selected to the preseason all-MEAC teams.

Offense

3rd team

Manasseh Bailey – WR

Matthew Thompson – C

Joshua Miles – OL

Defense

1st team

Malachi Washington – DL

Rico Kennedy – LB

3rd team

Ian McBorrough – LB

Carl Garnes – DB

Schedule

Source: Schedule

Despite also being a member of the MEAC, the game vs North Carolina A&T will be considered a non conference game and will not effect the MEAC standings.

Game summaries

Towson

at Akron

at Albany

at North Carolina A&T

South Carolina State

at Savannah State

Howard

at Florida A&M

Bethune–Cookman

Delaware State

at Norfolk State

Coaching staff

Players drafted into the NFL

References

Morgan State
Morgan State Bears football seasons
Morgan State Bears football